Crocus banaticus, syn. C. iridiflorus, is a species of flowering plant belonging to the family Iridaceae, native to the Balkans, particularly in Serbia, Romania and south western Ukraine. It creates its own subgenus in the Crocus subfamily known as Crociris.

Flowers, usually violet but also white, appear in autumn (fall). The small inner tepals are surrounded by three larger tepals, unlike the more symmetrical crocus species found outside of the subfamily. The flowers are followed by grass-like leaves, lacking the silver stripe normally associated with the genus.

Crocus banaticus has gained the Royal Horticultural Society's Award of Garden Merit.

References

Flora of Romania
Flora of Ukraine
Flora of Serbia
Plants described in 1831
banaticus